Aysun Özbek (born March 18, 1977) is a retired Turkish volleyball player. She is 185 cm tall and weighs 73 kg. Playing in the middle blocker position, she played for Vakıfbank Güneş Sigorta since 1996. She wore the number 5 jersey and was the team's captain.

Özbek also played over 200 times for the national team. She started her professional career with Fenerbahçe and played there for 6 years.

Clubs
  Fenerbahçe Istanbul (1990-1996)
  VakifBank Ankara (1996-2000)
  VakıfBank Güneş Sigorta Istanbul (2000-2008)
  Eczacıbaşı VitrA (2009-2011)

Awards

Individuals
 2003-2004 CEV Top Teams Cup Final Four "Best Blocker"
 2005-2006 CEV Champions League "Best Blocker"
 2007-2008 CEV Challenge Cup "Most Valuable Player"

National team
 1997 Mediterranean Games –  Silver Medal
 2001 Mediterranean Games –  Silver Medal
 2003 European Championship –  Silver Medal
 2005 Mediterranean Games –  Gold Medal

Clubs
 1996-1997 Turkish Cup -  Champion, with VakıfBank Ankara
 1996-1997 Turkish League -  Champion, with VakıfBank Ankara
 1997-1998 Turkish Cup -  Champion, with VakıfBank Ankara
 1997-1998 Turkish League -  Champion, with VakıfBank Ankara
 1997-1998 CEV Champions League -  Runner-up, with VakıfBank Ankara
 1998-1999 CEV Champions League -  Runner-up, with VakıfBank Ankara
 2000-2001 Turkish League –  Runner-up, with VakıfBank Güneş Sigorta
 2001-2002 Turkish League –  Runner-up, with VakıfBank Güneş Sigorta
 2002-2003 Turkish League –  Runner-up, with VakıfBank Güneş Sigorta
 2003-2004 Turkish League -  Champion, with VakıfBank Güneş Sigorta
 2003-2004 CEV Top Teams Cup -   Champion, with VakıfBank Güneş Sigorta
 2004-2005 Turkish League -  Champion, with VakıfBank Güneş Sigorta
 2005-2006 Turkish League –  Runner-up, with VakıfBank Güneş Sigorta
 2007-2008 CEV Challenge Cup -   Champion, with VakıfBank Güneş Sigorta
 2010-2011 Turkish Cup -  Champion, with Eczacıbaşı VitrA

See also
 Turkish women in sports

External links
 Player profile at vakifgunes.com
 
 
 Aysun Ozbek Ayhan at WorldofVolley
 Aysun Özbek Ayhan at Volleybox.net

1977 births
Living people
Volleyball players from Istanbul
Turkish women's volleyball players
Fenerbahçe volleyballers
VakıfBank S.K. volleyballers
Mediterranean Games gold medalists for Turkey
Mediterranean Games medalists in volleyball
Competitors at the 2005 Mediterranean Games